Chinedum Okwudire is an American academic in the field of engineering. He is an Associate Professor of Mechanical Engineering at University of Michigan, where he directs the Smart and Sustainable Automation Research Lab.

Education 
Okwudire received a Bachelor of Science degree in Mechanical Engineering from Middle East Technical University in 2005. Okwudire then completed his graduate studies at the University of British Columbia, earning a Masters of Applied Science in 2005 and a Ph.D. in 2009, both in Mechanical Engineering. Okwudire's doctoral thesis was on the modeling and control of feed drive systems for machine tools, using techniques such as finite element modeling and an adaptive sliding mode controller to improve drive servo bandwidth and disturbance rejection ability. After receiving his doctorate, Okwudire worked in industry before joining the University of Michigan faculty in 2011.

Career and research 
Okwudire is an Associate Professor of Mechanical Engineering and the Associate Chair of Integrative Systems + Design (ISD) at the University of Michigan. Okwudire is interested in Manufacturing Automation, including applications for 3D printing, nano-positioning, machining, and smart manufacturing systems. Okwudire's research interests also include Vehicle Automation, with applications in electric power-assist steering, steer-by-wire, and electric vehicle charging. At Michigan, Okwudire directs the Smart and Sustainable Automation Research Lab, which seeks to apply developments in the field of mechatronics to improve manufacturing capabilities in areas like additive manufacturing. Okwudire is also the founder and president of Ulendo Software, a company aiming to make his lab's breakthroughs in additive manufacturing software more widely available. The Ulendo algorithm doubles the speed of 3D printing by using feed-forward tracking control to compensate for the vibrations that arise at high printing speeds. Beyond research, Okwudire has been recognized for his work fostering diversity within the mechanical engineering department at Michigan. As part of his efforts, he led the establishment of student clubs for African-American undergraduate and graduate students, helped establish the Dean’s Advisory Committee for Faculty of Color, co-developed the NextProf Pathfinder Workshop to prepare Ph.D. students to pursue faculty positions, and began a middle school outreach program to inspire underrepresented minority students to pursue careers in STEM fields.

Awards 

 National Science Foundation CAREER Award, 2014
 International Symposium on Flexible Automation Young Investigator Award, 2016
 SAE Ralph Teetor Educational Award, 2016
 Society of Manufacturing Engineering Outstanding Young Manufacturing Engineer Award, 2016
 University of Michigan North Campus MLK Spirit Award, 2017
 University of Michigan Mechanical Engineering Department Achievement Award, 2017
 Russell Severance Springer Visiting Professor at UC Berkeley, 2018
 University of Michigan Associate Chair of Integrative Systems + Design (ISD), 2019
 University of Michigan Harold R. Johnson Diversity Service Award, 2019

Selected publications 

 Okwudire, Chinedum E., and Yusuf Altintas. "Hybrid modeling of ball screw drives with coupled axial, torsional, and lateral dynamics." Journal of Mechanical Design 131.7 (2009).
 Okwudire, Chinedum, and Yusuf Altintas. "Minimum tracking error control of flexible ball screw drives using a discrete-time sliding mode controller." Journal of Dynamic Systems, Measurement, and Control 131.5 (2009).
 Okwudire, Chinedum E., and Jihyun Lee. "Minimization of the residual vibrations of ultra-precision manufacturing machines via optimal placement of vibration isolators." Precision Engineering 37.2 (2013): 425-432.

References

External links
Smart and Sustainable Automation Research Lab
Ulendo Software

Living people
American roboticists

Year of birth missing (living people)